Casa de Carne is the name of Meat Loaf's 2008 European Summer Tour. After his 2007 tour was cut short due to a cyst on his vocal cord, Meat Loaf returned to the stage. To the delight of fans, Meat Loaf made his return alongside his longtime duet partner Patti Russo, who debuted one of her own original songs during Loaf's show. The tour kicked off in Plymouth, England on 27 June 2008 and continued through July and August with 20 showdates throughout Europe. Six United States showdates were also added for October and December 2008.

Tour dates

Setlists

UK Leg
"I Want You So Hard (Boy's Bad News)" (Eagles of Death Metal cover)
"If It Ain't Broke (Break It)"
"Out of the Frying Pan (And into the Fire)"
"Life Is a Lemon and I Want My Money Back"
"Bad for Good" (Omitted from US Leg)
"Dead Ringer for Love"
"45 Seconds of Ecstasy" (Omitted from US Leg)
"Amnesty Is Granted" (Omitted from US Leg)
"Bring Me a Bible and a Beer" (Patti Russo song) (Omitted from US Leg)
"Blind as a Bat" (Omitted from US Leg)
"Dissentience" (instrumental)
"Paradise by the Dashboard Light"
"Rock And Roll Dreams Come Through"
"You Took the Words Right Out of My Mouth (Hot Summer Night)"
"I'd Do Anything for Love (But I Won't Do That)"
"Bat Out of Hell"
"Roadhouse Blues" (The Doors cover)
"Why Don't We Do It in the Road?" (The Beatles cover)
"Mercury Blues" (Only on a few occasions was this performed)

US Leg
"I Want You So Hard (Boy's Bad News)" (Eagles of Death Metal cover)
"If It Ain't Broke (Break It)"
"Out of the Frying Pan (And into the Fire)"
"Life Is a Lemon and I Want My Money Back"
"Dead Ringer for Love"
"Dissentience" (instrumental)
"Paradise by the Dashboard Light"
"I'd Do Anything for Love (But I Won't Do That)"
"Two Out of Three Ain't Bad"
"Bat Out of Hell"
"Rock and Roll Dreams Come Through"
"Roadhouse Blues" (The Doors cover)
"Why Don't We Do It in the Road?" (The Beatles cover)
"You Took the Words Right Out of My Mouth (Hot Summer Night)"

Performers
Meat Loaf: Lead Vocals
Patti Russo: Lead Female Vocals
Paul Crook: Guitar
Randy Flowers: Guitar, Backing vocals
Kasim Sulton: Bass, Backing vocals, Music Director
Mark Alexander: Piano, Backing vocals
Dave Luther: Saxophone, Keyboards, Backing vocals
John Miceli: Drums
C.C. Coletti: Backing vocals

References

External links

Reviews
Still going "like a bat out of hell"
Meat may be a tad overdone but still in rare form
MUSIC REVIEW: Meat Loaf, Summer Pops, Liverpool
...und der Fleischklops rockt noch immer
Rock-Märchen im Gitarrengewitter
Rock com rugas e muita potencia
Lisbon Calling
Kraften finns kvar hos Meat Loaf
Meat Loaf at Pompano Beach, Florida

2008 concert tours
Meat Loaf concert tours